Vierer See is a lake in Bösdorf, Holsteinische Schweiz, Schleswig-Holstein, Germany. At an elevation of 19 m, its surface area is 1.32 km².

Lakes of Schleswig-Holstein
Plön